Josephine Hannah Chaplin (born March 28, 1949) is an American actress and the daughter of filmmaker Charlie Chaplin and his fourth wife, Oona O'Neill. She had a featured role in Pier Paolo Pasolini's The Canterbury Tales (1972) as May, the adulterous wife of the elderly Sir January.

Personal life
Chaplin had a son, Julien Ronet, by French actor Maurice Ronet, with whom she lived until his death in 1983.

Chaplin was married to Greek furrier Nicholas Sistovaris; the couple have one child, Charly.

Chaplin married Jean-Claude Gardin in 1989, with whom she has a son, Arthur. They stayed married until Gardin's death in 2013.

Filmography
 Limelight (1952) as the Child in opening scene (uncredited)
 A Countess from Hong Kong (1967)
 Canterbury Tales (1972)
 Escape to the Sun (1972)
 L'Odeur des fauves (1972)
 Les Quatre Charlots mousquetaires (1974)
 À nous quatre, Cardinal! (1974)
 Nuits Rouges (1974)
 Docteur Françoise Gailland (1976)
 The Peaks of Zelengora (1976)
 Jack the Ripper (1976)
 À l'ombre d'un été (1976)
 The Bay Boy (1984)
 Poulet au vinaigre (1985).
 Coïncidences (1986)
 Downtown Heat (1994)

Television
  (1975)
 Les années d'illusion (1977)
  (1979)
  (1981)
 Donatien-François, marquis de Sade (1985)
 Symphonie (1986)
  (1987)
 Hemingway (1988)
 Le masque (1989)

References

External links

 

American people of British descent
American people of English descent
American people of Irish descent
1949 births
Living people
Josephine
Actresses from Santa Monica, California
20th-century American actresses
American film actresses
American television actresses
21st-century American women